Clermont Foot 63 (Occitan: Clarmont d'Auvèrnhe; commonly referred to as Clermont Foot or simply Clermont) is a French association football club based in Clermont-Ferrand. The first incarnation of the club was formed in 1911 and the current club was created in 1990 as a result of a merger.

The club plays its home matches at the Stade Gabriel Montpied located within the city. Between 2014 and 2017, Clermont was managed by Corinne Diacre, the first woman to manage a men's professional football team.

History
The club started in 1911 under the name Stade Clermontois. Despite little league success in the early days, they reached the semi-finals of the Coupe de France during the 1945–46 season. Their professional status was repealed after the 1946–47 season due to financial difficulties. The club became professional again in 1966. 1984 saw an expansion, with Stade-Clermontois and AS Montferrand merging to form Clermont-Ferrand Football Club (CFC). The club was placed in the third division.

The club was later renamed Clermont Foot Auvergne, having to start again in the Division Honneur. After 13 years, Clermont Foot got promoted multiple times, from the Division Honneur up to Ligue 2 in 1993. During these 13 years of success, the club had numerous successes in the Coupe de France. One notable cup run was in 1997, when the Auvergne club eliminated three professional sides, Martigues, Lorient and then Paris Saint-Germain, before succumbing to Nice.

The club won the Championnat National in 2007, being promoted to Ligue 2 again, from which they had been relegated in 2006.

In 2014, Clermont became the first French professional men's team to appoint a female manager when they appointed Helena Costa. Less than a month after taking charge, Costa quit her role, and was replaced by another woman, Corinne Diacre, who would go on to train the French women's team.

Clermont were promoted to the Ligue 1 for the 2021–22 season for the first time in their history, having achieved promotion to the league after finishing second in the 2020–21 edition of the Ligue 2.

Honours
Championnat National
Winners: 2001–02, 2006–07

Players

Current squad

Out on loan

Retired numbers
14 -  Clément Pinault, Defender (2008–09) - posthumous honour

Notable former players
''For a list of former Clermont Foot players, see :Category:Clermont Foot players.

Club Officials

Coaches
 Albert Rust (2000–01)
 Hubert Velud (2001–04)
 Olivier Chavanon (2004–05)
 Dominique Bijotat (2005)
 Marc Collat (2005–06)
 Didier Ollé-Nicolle (2006–09)
 Michel Der Zakarian (2009–12)
 Régis Brouard (2012–14)
 Helena Costa (7 May 2014 – 24 June 2014)
 Corinne Diacre (28 June 2014 – 30 August 2017)
 Pascal Gastien (1 September 2017 –)

References

 
Association football clubs established in 1911
1911 establishments in France
Football clubs in Auvergne-Rhône-Alpes
Sport in Clermont-Ferrand
Ligue 1 clubs